David Jeff Elias (July 19, 1969 – June 5, 2013) was a Canadian curler from Winnipeg, Manitoba.

Elias grew up in Transcona, a suburb, now a neighbourhood of Winnipeg. Elias won two Manitoba men's provincial championships, the first in 2002 playing second for Mark Lukowich and the second in 2005 playing third for Randy Dutiaume. At the 2002 Nokia Brier, the Lukowich rink went 6–5, missing the playoffs. At the 2005 Tim Hortons Brier, Elias had more success. The Dutiaume rink made the playoffs following an 8-3 round robin record. They would end up losing in the semi-final to Nova Scotia's Shawn Adams.

He was married to Sue Elias and had two children. His mother, Irene won the provincial senior championships in 1999. Elias died of liver cancer in 2013.

References

External links
 

1969 births
2013 deaths
Curlers from Winnipeg
Deaths from cancer in Manitoba
Canadian male curlers
20th-century Canadian people